People Before Profit–Solidarity (PBPS, PBP–S, or S-PBP) is a left-wing electoral alliance in the Republic of Ireland. It was formed by members of two socialist political parties in the Republic of Ireland, People Before Profit (PBP) and Solidarity. Solidarity was known as the Anti-Austerity Alliance (AAA) until 2017. Since September 2019, the alliance also included the RISE party founded by Paul Murphy. In early 2021, RISE became fully integrated into PBP. The  alliance was formed in 2015 and replaced AAA and PBP in Ireland's official register of political parties; however, each entity retains its separate organisation and identity, and the PBP also retains its own registration in Northern Ireland. The alliance was created with the intent to obtain more speaking rights for its constituent members in Dáil Éireann after the 2016 Irish general election.

Both the PBP and the Socialist Party (SP) are all-Ireland organisations but do not form part of a single electoral alliance in elections in Northern Ireland. The PBP contests elections under its own name, while the SP is part of the Cross-Community Labour Alternative. The electoral alliance between the PBP and Solidarity supports anti-capitalism, democratic socialism, and eco-socialism, and promotes Irish reunification through a socialist European federation.

Background 
Under the standing rules of order in Dáil Éireann, a parliamentary group must have five TDs or more in order to have full speaking rights. In addition, political parties which get 2% or more of the national vote receive extra funding from the state for political activities. Combining the seats and votes of People Before Profit and Anti-Austerity Alliance would increase the chance of reaching these thresholds. An electoral alliance called United Left Alliance had been previously tried by People Before Profit and other left-wing groups in the early 2010s, and in many ways served as a precursor to this alliance.

The electoral alliance sought to provide a greater socialist voice in parliament, and a political platform committed to abolishing water charges, Universal Social Charge for low-middle income earners, and other austerity measures implemented in Ireland. The alliance claims to represent the 57% of people who boycotted the payment of water charges, and claims to provide a genuine working-class voice in parliament. The alliance has been described as a "remarkable abeyance of decades-old sectarian conflict between the Socialist Workers Party underlying PBP and the Socialist Party underlying AAA." Solidarity and People Before Profit announced its intention to organise separately and to remain free to maintain different political positions on various issues, but intend to cooperate electorally while maintaining their own identities and structures.

AAA de-registered as a party, while PBP changed its registered name to AAA–PBP and added AAA members to the renamed party's list of nominated representatives. This technical distinction caused a legal question regarding the co-option of a member of Cork City Council to replace AAA member Mick Barry after Barry's election to the Dáil in the 2016 election. It was argued that, since the party for whom Barry was elected in 2014 was no longer registered, the party he represented when vacating his council seat in 2016 did not have the right to nominate a replacement. Harry McGee, a columnist for The Irish Times, commented that it was difficult to tell the difference between People Before Profit and the AAA.

In 2019, Solidarity TD Paul Murphy formed RISE, a new political party which immediately became the alliance's third member. Rise later merged with People Before Profit in February 2021. In 2020, the group changed its registered name to People Before Profit–Solidarity, reflecting People Before Profit's increasing dominance of the grouping.

Electoral history 
Ahead of the 2016 Irish general election, there were four AAA–PBP TDs: Joe Higgins, Richard Boyd Barrett, Ruth Coppinger and Paul Murphy. Boyd Barrett was first elected to the Dáil at the 2011 Irish general election, while Coppinger and Murphy were both elected at by-elections, in May and October 2014, respectively. Higgins retired with the dissolution of the 31st Dáil, while the other three sought re-election. They ran 31 candidates at the 2016 Irish general election. On 25 January 2016, the group launched a set of "common principles", and later released separate party manifestos. Six TDs were elected.

At the 2019 Irish local elections, Solidarity–PBP won 11 seats, a loss of 17 seats from their combined total at the 2014 Irish local elections. At 2020 Irish general election, Solidarity–PBP returned five TDs, three from PBP, one from RISE, and one from Solidarity.

Dáil Éireann

Local elections

European Parliament

See also 
 Militant Left (Ireland)
 United Left Alliance, similar pre-2011 electoral alliance
 United Left (Ireland)

References

External links 
 People Before Profit
 Solidarity

2015 establishments in Ireland
Anti-capitalist political parties
Left-wing politics in Ireland
Political parties established in 2015
Political parties in the Republic of Ireland
Political party alliances in Ireland
Post-2008 Irish economic downturn
Socialist parties in Ireland
Socialist Party (Ireland)